is a Japanese voice actor who was born in Osaka, Japan. He's known for voicing characters who are jokers, but sometimes hide a more insidious nature such as Emishi Haruki in GetBackers, Loki in Valkyrie Profile, Joker in Flame of Recca, Kaname Ohgi in Code Geass, Issei Ryuudou in Fate/stay night, Kon in Bleach and Kōtarō Yanagisawa in Assassination Classroom.

Filmography

Anime television

1993
Yu Yu Hakusho – Mitsunari Yanagisawa, Zeru, Kujo

1995
Ninku – Aicho
Sorcerer Hunters – Marron Glace

1996
Martian Successor Nadesico – Sadaaki Munetake
The Vision of Escaflowne – Gatti

1997
Flame of Recca – Joker
The King of Braves GaoGaiGar – Soldato J/Pizza

1998
Bomberman B-Daman Bakugaiden – Kiirobon

1999
Monster Rancher – Colorpandora [Episode 28]
One Piece – Scratchmen Apoo, Thatch
Pocket Monsters: Episode Orange Archipelago - Hide (Tad)

2000
Argento Soma - Sheriff
Hajime no Ippo – Umezawa Masahiko

2001
PaRappa the Rapper – Tumo-chan Episode 18
Project ARMS – Lt. Karl Higgins
X-TV – Sorata Arisugawa

2002
Samurai Deeper Kyo – Chinmei
Shaman King – Peyote Diaz
Tenchi Muyo! GXP – Seiryo Tennan

2003
GetBackers – Emishi Haruki
Uninhabited Planet Survive! – Kaoru

2004
Fafner in the Azure – Idun
Bleach – Kon
Gantz – Hajime Muroto

2005
Guyver: The Bioboosted Armor – Murakami Masaki
Initial D: Fourth Stage – Ichijo/Man in Evo VI
Jang Geum's Dream – Jang Soo Ro

2006
Air Gear – Yoshitsune
Buso Renkin – Koshaku Chono (Papillon)
Code Geass: Lelouch of the Rebellion – Kaname Ohgi
Demashita! Powerpuff Girls Z – Ace
Fate/stay night – Issei Ryudo
High School Girls – Professor Odagiri
Onegai My Melody: KuruKuru Shuffle! – Jun Hiiragi
Saiunkoku Monogatari – Reishin Hong

2007
Angelique – Charlie
D.Gray-man – Cell Roron
Doraemon – Pawaemon
Shijō Saikyō no Deshi Kenichi – Siegfried
Pocket Monsters: Diamond and Pearl - Yūsuke (Jaco)
Shakugan no Shana II - Annaberg

2008
Gintama – Kamotaro Itou
Stitch! – Muun
To Love-Ru – Gi Buri

2009
Inuyasha: The Final Act – Byakuya

2010
Digimon Xros Wars – Neptunemon
Nurarihyon no Mago – Namahage
Super Robot Wars Original Generation: The Inspector – Yuuki Jaggar

2011
Persona 4: The Animation – Tōru Adachi
Pocket Monsters: Best Wishes! - Takemitsu (Freddy O'Martian)

2012
Mobile Suit Gundam AGE – Godom Tyneham
Pocket Monsters: Best Wishes! Season 2 - Takemitsu (Freddy O'Martian)
Sword Art Online – Kagemune

2013
Pocket Monsters: Best Wishes! Season 2: Decolora Adventure - Takemitsu (Freddy O'Martian)

2014
Dragon Ball Kai – Shapner
Gundam Build Fighters Try – Akira Suga
Persona 4: The Golden Animation – Tōru Adachi
Fate/stay night: Unlimited Blade Works – Issei Ryūdo

2015
Go! Princess PreCure – Close, Music Teachers
Fate/stay night [Unlimited Blade Works] 2nd Season – Issei Ryudo
Fate/kaleid liner Prisma Illya 2wei Herz! – Issei Ryūdo (ep. 3)
Shirobako – Takumi Yarase

2016
Assassination Classroom: Second Season – Kotaro Yanagisawa
Kagewani Sho – Reporter Kawakami (ep. 1), Villager (Voiced by M.S.S Project (KIKKUN-MK-II, eoheoh), Shunsuke Kanie) (ep. 3)

2017
Pocket Monsters: Sun & Moon – Sauboh (Faba)

2020
D4DJ First Mix – Rei's father

2021
Shaman King – Peyote Diaz

Original video animation (OVA)
Tenchi Muyo! (1992) – Seiryo Tennan
Hyper Doll (1995) – Akai
Sakura Diaries (1997) – Toma Inaba
Gekigangar III (1998) – Ken Tenku
The King of Braves GaoGaiGar Final – Soldato J/Pizza
InuYasha: Black Tetsusaiga (2008) – Byakuya

Anime films
Ranma ½: Big Trouble in Nekonron, China (1991) – Daihakusaei
Ranma ½: Nihao My Concubine (1992) – Toma
Doraemon: Nobita and the Galaxy Super-express (1996) – Aston
Crayon Shin-chan: The Storm Called: Yakiniku Road of Honor (2003) – Driver
Suite Precure♪ The Movie: Take it back! The Miraculous Melody that Connects Hearts (2011) – Flat
Saint Seiya: Legend of Sanctuary (2014) – Virgo Shaka
Fate/stay night: Heaven's Feel (2017) – Issei Ryūdo
Crayon Shin-chan: Burst Serving! Kung Fu Boys ~Ramen Rebellion~ (2018)
Code Geass: Lelouch of the Re;surrection (2019) – Kaname Ohgi

Video games
Crash Nitro Kart – Nash
Dragon Ball Z: Burst Limit – Tenshinhan
Eternal Sonata – Chopin
Initial D: Street Stage – Ichijo/Man in Evo VI
Initial D Arcade Stage 8 ∞ – Ichijo/Man in Evo VI
JoJo's Bizarre Adventure: Heritage for the Future – Noriaki Kakyoin, Rubber Soul
JoJo's Bizarre Adventure: All Star Battle – Josuke Higashikata [JoJolion]
JoJo's Bizarre Adventure: Eyes of Heaven – Josuke Higashikata [JoJolion]
Lego Island – Nick Brick
Persona 4 – Tōru Adachi
Persona 4 Golden – Tōru Adachi
Persona 4 Arena Ultimax – Tōru Adachi
Psychic Force – Burn Grifith
Psychic Force 2012 – Burn Grifith
Psychic Force Puzzle Taisen – Burn Grifith
Super Robot Wars – Soldato J/Pizza, Yuuki Jegnan, Idoun
Sly Cooper series – Bentley
Tales of Innocence – Hasta Extermi
Mana Khemia: Alchemists of Al-Revis – Tony Eisler
Mana Khemia 2: Fall of Alchemy – Tony Eisler
Night Trap – Jeff Martin
Super Robot Wars series – Yuuki Jaggar
Valkyrie Profile and Valkyrie Profile: Lenneth – Loki
The Thousand Musketeers - Ghost
Fate/Grand Order - Chen Gong
Fate/stay night - Issei RyudoJoJo's Bizarre Adventure: All Star Battle R – Josuke Higashikata [JoJolion]

TokusatsuGekisou Sentai Carranger (1996) – EE Musubinofu (ep. 45)Ninpuu Sentai Hurricaneger (2002) – Revival Ninja Vamp-Iyan (ep. 25)GoGo Sentai Boukenger (2006) – Prometheus Stone (ep. 39)Juuken Sentai Gekiranger (2007) – Mythical Beast Minotaurus-Fist ShiyuuEngine Sentai Go-onger (2008) – Air Pollution Kitaneidas (eps. 1 - 49) (voice), Inspector Misora (ep. 50) (actor)Engine Sentai Go-onger: Boom Boom! Bang Bang! GekijōBang!! (2008) – Air Pollution Kitaneidas, Young Samurai of Samurai WordEngine Sentai Go-onger vs. Gekiranger (2009) – Air Pollution KitaneidasSamurai Sentai Shinkenger vs. Go-onger: GinmakuBang!! (2010) – Air Pollution KitaneidasKaizoku Sentai Gokaiger vs. Space Sheriff Gavan: The Movie (2012) – Air Pollution KitaneidasRessha Sentai ToQger (2014) – Syringe Shadow (ep. 33)Shuriken Sentai Ninninger (2015) – Youkai Kasabake (ep. 16)Engine Sentai Go-onger 10 Years Grandprix (2018) – Air Pollution KitaneidasKaitou Sentai Lupinranger VS Keisatsu Sentai Patranger (2018) – Iselob Starfryed (ep. 38 - 39)

Other live-actionNatsuzora (2019) – Kick Jaguar (voice)

Drama CDsAo no Kiseki series 1: Ao no Kiseki – Professor SashaAo no Kiseki series 2: Catharsis Spell – Professor SashaFushigi Yūgi Genbu Kaiden – HakeiIshiguro Kazuomi shi no, Sasayaka na Tanoshimi – Kazuomi IshiguroLove Mode – Izumi SakashitaManatsu no Higaisha 1 & 2 – Suguru Hashimoto

Radio dramaAddicted to Curry – Makito KoenjiFinal Fantasy Tactics Advance (radio drama) – Famfrit

Dubbing roles

Live-action
Kwon Sang-wooMy Tutor Friend – Kim Ji-hoonStairway to Heaven – Cha Song-jooInto the Sun – Seok-min KangOnce Upon a Time in High School – Hyeon-SooSad Love Story – Seo Joon-young / Choi Joon-kyuAlmost Love – Ji-hwanCruel Love – Kang Yong-KiCinderella Man – Lee Joon-heeBig Thing – Ha Do-yaCZ12 – SimonShall We Do It Again – Jo Hyun-wooThe Divine Move 2: The Wrathful – Gwi-sooThe Adventures of Elmo in Grouchland – Big BirdThe Art of War III: Retribution – JasonBand of Brothers – Donald MalarkeyA Beautiful Mind – Bender (Anthony Rapp)Bill & Ted's Bogus Journey (1994 TV Tokyo edition) – Bill S. Preston (Alex Winter)Chicago Med – Dr. Ethan Choi (Brian Tee)The Counterfeiters – Burger (August Diehl)Cousin Skeeter – Skeeter (Bill Bellamy)Dr. Quinn, Medicine Woman – Matthew Cooper (Chad Allen)The Event – Sean Walker (Jason Ritter)Final Destination – Tod Waggner (Chad Donella)Knock Off – Tommy Hendricks (Rob Schneider)Meadowland – Tim (Giovanni Ribisi)Max Steel – Steel (Josh Brener)Mighty Morphin Power Rangers – Billy Cranston (eps. 1 - 48)October Sky – Quentin Wilson (Chris Owen)
  - Kermit The FrogThe Scorpion King – Arpid the Horse ThiefSesame Street (NHK Season 1-35 edition) – Big Bird, Ernie, Alan, Tingo (Caroll Spinney, Jim Henson, Steve Whitmire)She-Wolf of London – Man 1Star Trek: Voyager – Harry KimTeletubbies – DipsyVelvet Goldmine – Curt Wild (Ewan McGregor)

AnimationBatman: The Brave and the Bold – Fun HausJustice League – KilowogKung Fu Panda – Master CraneKung Fu Panda 2 – Master CraneKung Fu Panda 3 – Master CraneMegamind – MinionThe Pirates Who Don't Do Anything: A VeggieTales Movie – Elliot (Larry the Cucumber)Rio – TúlioSecrets of the Furious Five – CraneSurf's Up – Mikey AbromowitzThe Fairly OddParents – CosmoTUGS'' – Warrior, Blair and the Coast Guard's Messenger 
Wayside - Todd

References

External links
Mitsuaki Madono @ AONI Production

1964 births
Japanese male video game actors
Japanese male voice actors
Living people
Male voice actors from Osaka Prefecture
20th-century Japanese male actors
21st-century Japanese male actors
Aoni Production voice actors